The Manila City Council (Filipino: Sangguniang Panlungsod ng Maynila) or the city's legislature is composed of 38 councilors, with 36 councilors elected from Manila's six councilor districts (coextensive with the Legislative districts of Manila) and two councilors elected from the ranks of barangay (neighborhood) chairmen and the Sangguniang Kabataan (SK; youth councils). The presiding officer of the council is the Vice Mayor, who is elected citywide.

The council is responsible for creating laws and ordinances under Manila's jurisdiction. The mayor can veto proposed bills, but the council can override it with a two-thirds supermajority.

History
After the Spanish incorporated Manila as a city in 1571, membership to the council was originally restricted to them. On June 24, 1571 (which would later be declared as Manila Day), the municipal government, or the Cabildo was established, consisting of two mayors, twelve councilors and a secretary. The mayor was chosen by lottery, with councilors nominating four candidates, with two candidates being drawn to serve as mayors.

In 1689, the council ordered the expulsion on non-Christian Chinese in the city, leading to a decline in Chinese population by 1700.

This would be the setup until 1901, after the Americans took control of the islands. In that year, the new American insular government instituted a municipal board consisting of a Filipino mayor, a Filipino member, and three American members all nominated by the Americans. An advisory board was included, with all eleven members being Filipinos, representing each of Manila's 11 wards. In 1916, the advisory board was abolished, and the municipal board was increased to ten members, all of them elected by Filipinos, although the mayor was still appointed. In 1949, the Revised City Charter modified the board's composition: now, the five members of the House of Representatives of the Philippines from the city are its members, with the vice mayor becoming its presiding officer. After the declaration of martial law in 1972, President Ferdinand Marcos abolished the board in 1975.

After the People Power Revolution, the municipal board was revived, which gradually evolved into the present-day city council. The 1987 constitution finalized today's setup when it divided the city into six districts, with each district electing six councilors, plus two more councilors from the barangay captains and SK president. Elections to the new city council was in 1988.

After actress Claire Danes stated in an interview with Premiere that Manila "smelled of cockroaches, with rats all over and that there is no sewerage system and the people do not have anything, no arms, no legs, no eyes," Councilor Kim Atienza sponsored a resolution banning all of Danes' films in the city. While Atienza said that Danes' earlier interview with Vogue where she said that "ghastly and weird city" were forgivable, her statements in Premiere were "irresponsible sweeping statements." After the council approved the measure on a 23–3 vote in 1998.

In 2006, the council banned the screening of the film The Da Vinci Code in the city. In a unanimous resolution allowing Mayor Lito Atienza to prohibit screenings, the resolution cited the constitution's freedom of exercise of religion, and the Revised Penal Code of the Philippines which states that it is a crime to exhibit films which offend a religion. Councilor Benjamin Asilo also cited an earlier ordinance which "prohibits the showing of obscene and immoral movies, including those that are contrary to morals, good customs, religious beliefs, principles or doctrines."

In July 2012, the city is on track on following neighboring cities in Metro Manila by passing an ordinance on second reading banning the use of plastics and polystyrene. The proposed ordinance aims to prevent perennial flooding in the city, and to reduce debris flowing to the Pasig River.

In the ongoing controversy on the status of the Pandacan Oil Depot, the council in September 2012 overrode Mayor Alfredo Lim's veto. This meant the oil depots would have to be transferred by 2016.

Seat
The council sits at the Manila City Hall. Starting in 2012, its session hall is powered via solar panels, which were made in Taiwan. In its inauguration, Vice Mayor Isko Moreno remarked that "The City of Manila will be the first to use this kind of technology here in the Philippines."

The Spanish-era cabildo met at the Ayuntamiento de Manila, also known as the Casas Consistoriales, in Intramuros.

Membership
Each of Manila's six councilor districts elects six councilors to the council. In plurality-at-large voting, a voter may vote up to six candidates, with the candidates having the six highest number of votes being elected. In addition, the barangay chairmen and the SK chairmen throughout the city elect amongst themselves their representatives to the council. Hence, there are 38 councilors.

City council elections are synchronized with other elections in the country. Elections are held every first Monday of May every third year since 1992 for 36 seats, while the ex officio seats are elected irregularly, but always proceeding a barangay election.

Current members
Presiding Officer: Vice Mayor John Marvin "Yul Servo" Nieto

Presiding Officer Pro-Tempore: 
Majority Leader: Ernesto Isip Jr.
Minority Leader: Salvador Philip Lacuna
Majority Whip: 
Minority Whip: 
1st Assistant Majority Leader: 
2nd Assistant Majority Leader: 
1st Assistant Minority Leader: 
2nd Assistant Minority Leader: 
Secretary to the City Council (City Government Department Head III): 
Assistant Secretary to the City Council (City Government Assistant Department Head III) :

Prominent councilors
Rosauro Almario, essayist
Amado V. Hernandez, National Artist of the Philippines for Literature
Cita Astals, actress
Kim Atienza, television personality
Isabelo de los Reyes, founder of the Philippine Independent Church
Ernesto Maceda, former Senate president
Isko Moreno, former Manila Mayor, former Manila Vice Mayor, and actor
Mel Lopez, former Manila mayor
Carmen Planas, first woman elected to any government post in the Philippines
Larry Silva, actor

Former Manila City Council Members

References

City councils in the Philippines
Local government in Manila
Politics of Manila